Lasco or LASCO may refer to:
 Lasco, California, United States
 Lasco Jamaica, a food, financial, household and personal care and pharmaceutical company based in Kingston, Jamaica
 Laboratory for the Analysis of Organisational Communication Systems, in Louvain-la-Neuve in Belgium
 Large Angle and Spectrometric Coronagraph, an instrument on the Solar and Heliospheric Observatory satellite (SOHO)
 Larkin Aircraft Supply Company, an Australian aircraft manufacturer
 John a Lasco (1499–1560), Polish Protestant evangelical reformer

See also 
 Lascaux
 Lasko (disambiguation)